Otis Theodore Wingo (June 18, 1877 – October 21, 1930) was an American lawyer and politician who served as a U.S. representative from Arkansas's 4th congressional district from 1913 to 1930. He was the husband of his successor in office, Effiegene Wingo.

Biography 
Born in Weakley County in northwestern Tennessee, Wingo attended the public schools, Bethel College at McKenzie, Tennessee, the former McFerrin College at Martin in Weakley County, Tennessee, and Valparaiso University in Indiana. He taught school and studied law, having been admitted to the bar in 1900. He established his practice in De Queen in Sevier County in southwestern Arkansas. From 1907 to 1909, Wingo was a member of the Arkansas State Senate.

In 1912, Wingo was elected as a Democrat to the Sixty-third and to the eight succeeding Congresses, having served from March 4, 1913, until his death while undergoing surgery in Baltimore, Maryland, on October 21, 1930.

In 1927, Wingo joined his fellow Democrat, U.S. Senator Joseph Taylor Robinson, and Republican State Representative Osro Cobb of Montgomery County in proposing the establishment of a second national park in Arkansas which would have been located in the scenic Ouachita National Forest about halfway between Little Rock and Shreveport, Louisiana. The proposal, which would have been in driving distance of then some 45 million Americans, was pocket vetoed by U.S. President Calvin Coolidge.

Upon Wingo's death, Cobb was urged by his party to contest the vacant U.S. House seat in a special election, but he instead deferred to Wingo's widow.

Wingo and his wife are interred at Rock Creek Cemetery in Washington, D.C.

See also

List of United States Congress members who died in office (1900–49)

References

1877 births
1930 deaths
Democratic Party Arkansas state senators
People from Weakley County, Tennessee
People from De Queen, Arkansas
Arkansas lawyers
Valparaiso University alumni
Burials at Rock Creek Cemetery
Democratic Party members of the United States House of Representatives from Arkansas